Luis Eduardo Cequeira (born February 4, 1985) is an Argentine professional basketball player. He plays at the point guard position. He has been a member of the Argentine national basketball team.

Professional career
Cequeira began his professional career in the Argentine League with Quilmes Mar del Plata during the 2001-02 season. He has since competed on four other teams while spending his career in the Argentine league.  In the 2006–07 season, he helped Boca Juniors win the league title while being named League Sixth Man of the Year.  Cequeira has competed in the Liga Sudamericana, the top international competition for South American basketball clubs, on three occasions – 2006, 2008, and 2009.

After spending the 2009–10 season with Juventud Sionista, Cequeira signed a one-year deal with fellow Argentine side Obras Sanitarias on May 19, 2010.

National team career
Cequeira is also a member of the senior men's Argentine national basketball team. He made his debut with the senior Argentine national team in 2007 at the 2007 Pan American Games.  He later participated at the 2008 and 2010 South American Championship, helping the team to a gold medal in 2008 and a silver medal in 2010.

In 2010, Cequeira was named to Argentina's 2010 FIBA World Championship squad – his first major international tournament – when long-time point guard Juan Pablo Cantero withdrew with a torn hamstring.

References

External links
 FIBA profile
 LatinBasket.com profile

1985 births
Living people
Argentine men's basketball players
Basketball players at the 2007 Pan American Games
Basketball players at the 2011 Pan American Games
Boca Juniors basketball players
Juventud Sionista basketball players
Obras Sanitarias basketball players
Pan American Games competitors for Argentina
Point guards
Quilmes de Mar del Plata basketball players
Regatas Corrientes basketball players
2010 FIBA World Championship players
Club Comunicaciones (Mercedes) basketball players
People from Resistencia, Chaco
Sportspeople from Chaco Province